The Ministry of Food and Drug Administration is a ministry of the Government of Maharashtra. The ministry is responsible for consumer protection and regulating food and drug related issues in Maharashtra. 

The Ministry is headed by a cabinet level minister. Sanjay Rathod
since 29 June 2022 is current Minister of Food and Drugs Administration.

Head office

List of Cabinet Ministers

List of Ministers of State

List of Principal Secretary

History 
Directorate of Drugs Control was renamed as Food and Drug Administration in 1970. Scope of FDA was increased to cover adulterated food as well as tobacco products. Various circle offices were opened in 1971 at city levels. Expansion took place in 1975 and posts of commissioners as well as joint commissioners were created to grant licenses at divisional levels.

Structure
Ministry controls Food and Drug Administration Department. The department acts as execution wing to take actions. Cabinet level minister is assisted by the minister of state for administration.

Authorities
Prevention of Food Adulteration Act, 1954 gives powers to various authorities to regulate food and drug related issues.

Commissioner
Commissioner is head of 
Drug Control Laboratory
Food Health Authority
Drug Administration

Joint Commissioners
Several joint commissioners are appointed to oversee
Food
Drugs 
Law

Divisional Joint Commissioners
Administrative head for the Division and Licensing Authority for grant of Drugs Manufacturing Licenses (As per Drugs and Cosmetics Act 1940.)

References

External links 
 

Government ministries of Maharashtra